Brindlee Mountain (or "Brindley Mountain") is an isolated portion of the Appalachian Plateau in northern Alabama.  It occupies significant portions of Cullman, Morgan, and Marshall Counties and extends into Winston and Lawrence counties.  The plateau is formed by a sandstone cap-rock overlying limestone. The main mountain sits south of Lacey's Spring and houses communities such as Union Hill and Morgan City as well as parts of Union Grove and spans into Arab also. U.S. Route 231 runs over Brindlee Mountain. The highest point of Brindlee Mountain rests in Morgan City. 

Several radio stations have broadcast towers located on Brindley Mountain.  Those include WRSA, WTAK, WZZN, WAFN-FM, WRJL, and WRAB.

References

Mountains of Alabama
Landforms of Cullman County, Alabama
Landforms of Morgan County, Alabama
Landforms of Marshall County, Alabama
Landforms of Winston County, Alabama
Landforms of Lawrence County, Alabama